Gazi Mustafa Kemal Boulevard, abbreviated as GMK Boulevard, is a major avenue in Mersin, Turkey. It is named after Mustafa Kemal Atatürk (1881-1938), the founder of Turkish Republic.

Geography
The boulevard is a part of the state highway , where it passes through the urban fabric of Mersin.

During this course in Akdeniz second level municipality, the boulevard passes on a bridge over the railroad. On both sides of the boulevard, there are shops of small industrial area. Mersin State Hospital is situated on the south side of the boulevard.
 

This portion is mostly composed of residential quarters of the city. A part of Mersin University's facilities is between the two boulevards.

Beyond the university, the boulevard continues for another  in Mezitli second level municipality before merging to D-400.

History
In the 1950s, the boulevard was constructed to the northwest of the city as a bypass road to ease the traffic of the state highway. But after the construction of the boulevard, the population of the city increased about ten-fold, and many new quarters appeared to the north of the boulevard. Thus the boulevard as well as two more recent boulevards to the north became intracity boulevards. Now, the GMK Boulevard with heavy traffic is one of the main arterial roads of Mersin.

References

External links
Wowturkey for images

Streets in Mersin
Things named after Mustafa Kemal Atatürk